Nina Žižić (born 20 April 1985) is a Montenegrin singer.

RTCG announced in December 2012 that Who See would represent Montenegro in the Eurovision Song Contest 2013 held in Malmö together with a "secret artist" which was Nina. Their entry was the song "Igranka". The song was performed as part of the first semi-final heat on Tuesday 14 May 2013. They didn't qualify coming 12th with 41 points.

References

1985 births
Living people
21st-century Montenegrin women singers
Eurovision Song Contest entrants for Montenegro
Eurovision Song Contest entrants of 2013
Musicians from Nikšić